Silvio Soldán (born March 26, 1935 in Colonia Belgrano) is a TV host from Argentina.

Career 
Soldán has worked in the game show Feliz domingo para la juventud. He currently works in the TV channel "Volver".

References

External links
 

Argentine game show hosts
People from San Martín Department, Santa Fe
1935 births
Living people